The 1995 FIFA World Player of the Year award was won by George Weah. He is the first African player to win the award and the only one to date. The gala  took place at the Teatro Nazionale in Milan, on January 8, 1996. 95 national team coaches, based on the current FIFA Men's World Ranking were chosen to vote. It was organised by European Sports Media, Adidas, FIFA and Italian newspaper Gazzetta dello Sport.

Results

References

FIFA World Player of the Year
FIFA World Player of the Year